Sir George Frederick Edmonstone, KCB (11 April 1813 – 24 September 1864) was an administrator in India.

Life
Edmonstone was born in Calcutta, the fourth son of Neil Benjamin Edmonstone (1765–1841), a member of the supreme council in India and a director of the East India Company.

In 1829 Edmonstone went to the East India College at Haileybury, the precursor of Haileybury and Imperial Service College, before proceeding to Bengal in 1831.

He held various positions in the Indian civil service before being appointed as Lieutenant-Governor of the North-Western Provinces from 19 January 1859 to 27 February 1863.

One of the houses at Haileybury and Imperial Service College was named after Edmonstone, along with other distinguished Indian civil servants.

Time line

|-

|-

References

1813 births
1864 deaths
Indian Civil Service (British India) officers
People from Kolkata
British East India Company civil servants
Knights Commander of the Order of the Bath